The abyssal spiderfish, Bathypterois longipes, is a species of deepsea tripod fish, a demersal fish living on the bottom of the Atlantic Ocean, even on the abyssal plain. It is one of the deepest-dwelling fish known.

Táto osamelá ryba rastie asi desať palcov a má "statívovú" formáciu plutiev, ktoré sa používajú na odpočinok na dne a na pohyb na vodnom stĺpci. Žije v extrémne studenej vode, v temperách .

References

 WoRMS entry
 Fishbase entry

Ipnopidae
Fish described in 1878
Taxa named by Albert Günther